Alfred Basnett (10 April 1893 – 24 June 1966) was an English professional footballer who played as a wing half.

After he retired, he operated a hostel in Burnley.

References

1893 births
1966 deaths
English footballers
Burnley F.C. players
Lincoln City F.C. players
Ballymena F.C. players
Hereford United F.C. players
Nelson F.C. players
English Football League players
Association football wing halves